Yeshe Dorjee Thongchi (born 13 June 1952) is an Indian writer. He was formerly deputy commissioner. His first literary creation is a poem named Junbai'(জোনবাই).

He is the recipient of India's prestigious award Padma Shri 2020 for his work in the field of literature and education.

Awards
Padmashri- Govt of India, 2020
 Sahitya Akademi Award, 2005 for Assamese novel Mauna Outh Mukhar Hriday (Silent lips, Murmuring Heart)
 Kalaguru Bishnu Rabha Literary Award-Assam Sahitya Sabha-2001
 Sukapha Award- Govt of Assam 2021
 Assam Valley Literary Award- Williamson Megor Educational trust kolkata  2017 
 Bhasha Bharati Award from the central Institute of Indian languages (CIIL) Mysore. 2005
 Acharya Hazari Prasad Dwivedi Samman, Hindi Parishad, Prayagraj 2019
 Bodosa Award- All Moran Students Union, 2019
 Special Achievement Award (Literature)- Buddhist Cultural Preservation Society, Bomdila. 2013
 Sadin-Pratidin  Gosthi Special Achievement Award (Literature and Journalism). 2017 
 DrBhupen Hazarika Sanhati Bota 2016 by Dr. Bhupen Hazarika Trust, Kolkata-Guwahati
 Rangbang Terang Samanyay Award-2018- Sinthar Prakashan, Bololiaghat, Karbi Anglong. Assam
 Dr.Maidul Islam Bora literary Award, 2014  Dr. M.I Bora Trust, Sibsagar, Assam
 Lakhiminath Bezbaruah Literary Award 2018 Assam 
 Phulchand Khandelwal Sanghati Bata award, 2001
 Basudev Jalan Award from Assam Sahitya Sabha
 Bhupen Hazarika National Award 2017 from Sarhad (a Pune based NGO).
 D.Litt (Honoris Causa)-Dibrugarh University Assam

works

Novels
 Mauna Outh Mukhar Hriday (Silent lips, Murmuring Heart), 2005
 Sonam, 1982
 Lingjhik
 Bih Kanyar deshat
 Saw kata Manuh
 Mishing
 Moi Akou janam lom

Collections of Short Stories
 Papor pukhuri (A Sinful of Pond)
 Bah Fular Gundh
 Anya Ekhan pratiyugita
 Dhar aru Ananya Galpa

Folktales
 Kameng Simantar Sadhu

History of Community
 Sherdukpen Janajatir Itibritya

Travelougue-
 Dhuniya Manuhar Dhuniya Deshat ( Travel to South Korea)

Translations-
1. Into Assamese-
Sainikar Senapati (Translation of Gen. J.J.Singh's autobiography 'The Soldier's General')
 Prabahat Mukta Jiwan (Translation of His Holiness Dalai Lama's autobiography Freedom in Exile with his foreword)
 Bodhucharyavatara ( Translation of Acharya Shantideva's Sanskrit Buddhist classic of sixth century in poetic form)
2. Into English-
Heart to Heart (Translation of Lummer Dai's Assamese novel Mon aru Mon)

Autobiography-
Hanhi aru Sakulor Saisav (First part of autobiography)

Books 
Yeshe Dorje Thongchi Books in Amazon.

References

Indian male novelists
Indian Buddhists
Living people
1952 births
Indian people of Tibetan descent
Novelists from Assam
Writers from Arunachal Pradesh
Recipients of the Sahitya Akademi Award in Assamese
Indian male short story writers
20th-century Indian novelists
20th-century Indian short story writers
20th-century Indian male writers
 Recipients of the Padma Shri in literature & education
 People from West Kameng district